Siri Raja Siri, theatrically as Siri Raja Siri alias Kiri Ibbandeniye Maharajathuma, is a 2008 Sri Lankan Sinhala children's drama film directed by Somaratne Dissanayake and  co-produced by himself with his wife Renuka Balasooriya. It stars Kokila Pawan Jayasuriya, Dilhani Ekanayake and Jayalath Manoratne in lead roles along with Mahendra Perera and Jayalath Manoratne. Music composed by Rohana Weerasinghe. The plot of the film received positive reviews. It is the 1102nd Sri Lankan film in the Sinhala cinema.

Plot
Sirimal is a bright young poor boy living in a rural village area in Sri Lanka. When he passes the all-island scholarship exam with becoming the first place in the island, he wins a chance to attend a wealthy school in Colombo. Despite his many cries and tears to leave his hometown and family, he travels to Colombo with his father. Sirimal does well in the school, gaining many friends as well as a spoiled rival, Shehan.

When the School drama teacher announces about their annual Drama Competition, Sirimal is determined to get the main role, which is the King's role. However, he wins the role of his dreams, but he hasn't got enough money for the costume. Shehan, who also wanted that role, encourages Sirimal to swap roles, which is the Rajadrohiya's role. But Sirimal doesn't want to.

Sirimal and his best friend tries to earn money to buy the costume by doing part time jobs, such as shoe polishing and working in a store. But Sirimal's father insists they get help from the village's dancing teacher, who gives Sirimal his king costume. But the crown is too big for Sirimal.

The drama teacher tells Sirimal to make a ring out of cloth and cotton. After that he will be able to wear the crown no matter how big it is. On the day of the performance, Shehan steals the cotton ring from Sirimal while he's in the washroom. After a tearful tantrum, the drama teacher decides to give Shehan the king's role and Sirimal the cheap rajadrohiya role. Sirimal protests, but he gives an extraordinary performance as the Rajadrohiya and wins the best actor award. The film ends with Sirimal acting as the king in their village drama competition.

Cast
 Kokila Jayasuriya as Sirimal
 Shehan Randeniya as Shehan
 Dilhani Ekanayake as Sirimal's mother
 Mahendra Perera as Gune, Sirimal's father 
 Sharanya Jayakodi as Sirimal's sister
 Jayalath Manoratne as Weerasinghe, school's drama teacher
 Prasannajit Abeysuriya as Village school principal
 Sanath Gunathilake as Principal
 Rathna Lalani Jayakody as Class Teacher
 Giriraj Kaushalya as Theater controller
 Richard Manamudali as Television reporter
 Rohana Baddage as himself
 H. A. Perera as himself
 Charitha Priyadarshani as herself
 Chandrasoma Binduhewa as Drama Master
 Sampath Tennakoon as Shehan's father

Soundtrack

Awards and nominations
The film won several awards at international film festivals.

|-
|| 2014 ||| Dhaka International Film Festival || Best Audience Award for Best Film || 
|-
|| 2008 ||| Asia Pacific Screen Awards || Asia Pacific Screen Award for Best Children's Feature Film || 
|-
|| 2008 ||| Mexico International Children Film Festival || Jury Mention Award for Best Film || 
|-
|| 2008 ||| Lola International Children Film Festival || Silver Knobi Award for Best Film || 
|-
|| 2008 ||| Argentina International Children Film Festival || Signis Jury Award for the Best Film || 
|-
|| 2008 ||| Rimouski International Children Film Festival || CamerioHumanitas Award || 
|-
|| 2008 ||| Rimouski International Children Film Festival || Cifej Award || 
|-
|| 2008 ||| Chinese International Children Film Festival || Award for the Best Child Actor || 
|-

References

2008 films
2000s Sinhala-language films